Frank Henry Waters (2 December 1908 –18 October 1954) was a Scottish rugby union player.

He also played for Cambridge University RFC and London Scottish FC.

He was the son of Joseph Waters, who was also capped for Scotland.

He married actress Joan Maude in 1933, and they were together until his death in 1954.

References
 Bath, Richard (ed.) The Scotland Rugby Miscellany (Vision Sports Publishing Ltd, 2007 )

1908 births
1954 deaths
Cambridge University R.U.F.C. players
London Scottish F.C. players
Scotland international rugby union players
Scottish rugby union players